The women's 44 kg powerlifting event at the 2012 Summer Paralympics was contested on 31 August at ExCeL London.

Records 
Prior to the competition, the existing world and Paralympic records were as follows.

Results

References 

 

Women's 044 kg
Para